Pseudoacontias madagascariensis, the giant Madagascar skink, is a species of lizard which is endemic to Madagascar.

References

madagascariensis
Reptiles of Madagascar
Reptiles described in 1889
Taxa named by José Vicente Barbosa du Bocage